Fruit of Temptation (Spanish: Verde doncella) is a 1968 Spanish comedy film directed by Rafael Gil and starring Sonia Bruno, Juanjo Menéndez and Antonio Garisa.

Cast
 Sonia Bruno as Laura  
 Juanjo Menéndez as Moncho  
 Antonio Garisa as El hombre de la maleta  
 Mary Paz Pondal as Conchita  
 Julia Caba Alba as Madre de Laura  
 Rafael López Somoza as Padre de Laura 
 Venancio Muro as Martínez  
 Manuel Alexandre as Don Manuel  
 Erasmo Pascual as Vendedor del piso  
 Goyo Lebrero as Vendedor de tobacco  
 José María Tasso as Fotógrafo  
 Pedrín Fernández as Jefe del taller  
 Mario Morales as Botones  
 Alfredo Santacruz as Comisario

References

Bibliography
 de España, Rafael. Directory of Spanish and Portuguese film-makers and films. Greenwood Press, 1994.

External links 

1968 films
1968 comedy films
Spanish comedy films
1960s Spanish-language films
Films directed by Rafael Gil
1960s Spanish films